Neuschwanstein was an enstatite chondrite (type EL6) meteorite that fell to Earth on 6 April 2002 at 22:20:18 GMT near Neuschwanstein Castle, Bavaria, at the Germany–Austria border.

The original meteorite burst into several fragments at a height of about 22 kilometers (14 miles) above the ground. The fragments descended on an area of several square kilometers. Neuschwanstein was the first meteorite in Germany, and the fourth in the world, that was monitored by one of the world's fireball networks, namely by the European Fireball Network. Photographing the meteor simultaneously from several locations allowed accurate reconstruction of its trajectory.

Meteorite fall 

Then the meteorite went into free fall which lasted about 108 seconds. The fragments were displaced in the lower atmosphere (troposphere) from their expected trajectories by strong wind.

The European Fireball Network monitored the meteor from several stations, including those in Augsburg (Germany), Přimda (Czech Republic) and Weyregg am Attersee (Austria). Simultaneous observation allowed accurate reconstruction of the flight path using triangulation. Neuschwanstein was the first meteorite in Germany and the fourth meteorite in the world that was monitored by one of the several world's fireball networks, after Príbram meteorite of Czechoslovakia in 1959; Oklahoma in 1970 and Canada in 1977.

Eyewitness reports 
The fall caused a media stir and was observed by outdoor witnesses through most of central Europe. Loud rumbling and rattling of windows was reported in southern Bavaria, in particular in the Garmisch-Partenkirchen area, and the sound was audible within at least . The meteor left a spectacular trace in the night skies followed by a burst into half a dozen falling yellow-orange fragments. The total duration of the event which was observed by thousands of random observers was about six seconds. It was recorded by cameras, radiometers, infrasound detectors and seismic arrays making this one of the best-documented meteorite falls. The area of the fall attracted hunters for the meteorite fragments for weeks and months after the fall.

Analysis of the heliocentric orbit 

Records of the European Fireball Network allowed reconstruction of the orbit of the meteoroids Neuschwanstein (European Network name: EN060402) around the Sun. The reconstructed orbit was very close to that of Pribram (EN070459) which fell on 7 April 1959 in the former Czechoslovakia, and thus both meteorites could originate from the same parent body. Pribram is an ordinary chondrite (type H5). Isotope analysis resulted in the age of 48 million years for Neuschwanstein and 12 million years for Pribram, and thus the common parent body would have to be heterogeneous. It could be a "rubble pile" which was held together only by gravitational force and was shattered by a collision with another body.

Fragments 
The German Aerospace Center (DLR) estimated the original mass of the meteoroid as 300 kilograms, of which about 20 kilograms should have reached the ground. A ground expedition was sent on 1 May by the DLR looking for the largest fragment on the south side of Hoher Straußberg Mountain near Neuschwanstein and on the north side of Ochsenälpeleskopf, but without success, despite intensive search.

Neuschwanstein I
After a week-long search in the target area, on 14 July 2002, two Berlin amateur astronomers found the first  fragment. The fragment and the meteorite were named because of proximity of the landing place to the famous Neuschwanstein Castle.

Neuschwanstein II 

Because of a year spent in the moist mountain forest soil, the fragment showed traces of corrosion.

Neuschwanstein III
A German physicist predicted the location of that fragment by computer simulation, properly taking into account the wind-induced drift, which might have been miscalculated previously.

Composition of the meteorite
The composition of Neuschwanstein I was analyzed in September 2002 at the Max-Planck Institute for chemistry in Mainz and at the Institute for Planetology in Münster. Based on the analysis, the meteorite was assigned to the rare class of enstatite chondrite (type EL6) that is characterized by a high content of native iron (28.6 wt%), the silicate mineral enstatite (Mg2Si2O6), and the extremely rare mineral sinoite (Si2N2O).

Legal situation and whereabouts of the finds 
As Neuschwanstein I and II were found in Germany, the province of Bavaria claimed co-ownership of those fragments as treasure. This case finally came to a court agreement under which Bavaria purchased from the finders their part of Neuschwanstein I, and this fragment is now displayed in the Rieskrater Museum in Nördlingen. The finder share of Neuschwanstein II could not be acquired, however, due to lack of funds. Subsequently, this fragment was cut into numerous parts: the finders have sold their half as test samples to museums, institutions and private collections. The other half of Neuschwanstein II is owned by the Museum Reich der Kristalle; it is inaccessible to the public, but is available for research.

The ownership of Neuschwanstein III was claimed by the Austrian municipality of Reutte in the Augsburg District Court. The German court dismissed the claim on 6 June 2007 and awarded all property rights to the finder. The mayor of Reutte appealed the case, and in January 2008, both parties agreed on a settlement, under which the finder paid compensation to the municipality but was allowed to keep the fragment. The price of Neuschwanstein III was estimated at about 200,000 to 300,000 euros.

See also
 Glossary of meteoritics

References

Literature

External links 
  
 
  – video of the Neuschwanstein meteorite (surveillance camera)

Chondrite meteorites
Meteorites found in Germany